is a Japanese television series and the ninth installment of the Super Sentai metaseries. It aired from February 2, 1985 to February 22, 1986, replacing Choudenshi Bioman and was replaced by Choushinsei Flashman running for 55 episodes, making it the second longest after Himitsu Sentai Goranger. It is the third Super Sentai series after J.A.K.Q. Dengekitai and Battle Fever J where the Yellow Ranger is absent, followed by 2013's Zyuden Sentai Kyoryuger and 2019's Kishiryu Sentai Ryusoulger. The international English title is listed by Toei as simply Changeman.

Plot
After conquering hundreds of planets, the Star Cluster Gozma sets its sights on Earth. To defend it, the Japanese military forms an elite Earth Defense Force. Under Commander Ibuki, the force begins rigorous training.

Meanwhile, as their first act, the Gozma decide to eliminate those who pose the greatest risk of interfering with their invasion: the military. After a brutal day of training, the Earth Defense Force recruits are fed up with Ibuki's cruel ways and leave the training session. Soon afterwards, they are attacked by Gozma troops. Five surviving officers gather together, beaten and exhausted but refusing to retreat from the threat. The Earth trembles, empowering them with the Earth Force, giving them the power of mythological beasts and becoming the Changeman. With the mystical power of the Earth Force and military technology, the Changeman begin their war against Gozma.

Characters

Changeman

The Changeman are all former members of the various branches of Japanese military who were hand picked by the Earth Defense Force to combat Gozma. As the Changeman, they derive their powers from a mysterious energy called , which gives its users the power to protect Earth from any threat to it.

: Hiryu was previously an officer from Kōchi Prefecture in the Japanese Air Force before becoming Change Dragon, colored red. Tsurugi is a passionate leader with a kind heart, often getting so focused on a task that he does not think of the possible danger he puts himself in to complete it. He is a sharpshooter and a skilled motorcycle driver. He was also his high school's best baseball player until an accident forced him to quit the game. As Change Dragon, Hiryu is a master of airborne attacks as well as close-range and long-range attacks, even adding some of his baseball skills into his techniques.
: Sho was previously a Japanese Army Ranger from  Aomori Prefecture before becoming Change Gryphon, colored black. He's a narcissistic womanizer, often combing his hair before entering battle, though it's an exterior for his kind personality.
: Yuma was previously a Branch Officer in the Japanese Army before becoming Change Pegasus, colored blue. He serves as the group's tech member with the ability to tap into superhuman strength. As the youngest, he tends not to respect authority much and often associates himself with the children that the Changemen help. Yuma also has a dream to open up a tonkatsu shop after getting enough money to start it up.
: Sayaka was previously a task force officer in the Japanese Army before becoming Change Mermaid, colored white. She is the team's strategist, and sometimes focuses too much on the etiquette of her fellow Changemen. However, Sayaka has a loving and caring aspect of her seen in animals and her feelings for Hiryu.
: Mai was previously a spy for the Japanese Army before becoming Change Phoenix, colored pink. Like Hiryu, she is also skilled at motorcycle driving. Though appearing to be a tomboy who is rough around the edges, Mai is a caring figure and good friends with Sayaka despite their differences.

Arsenal
 : The transformation device of the Changemen. It can also fire a Change Laser.
 : A sidearm with two modes: blaster and knight (sword and shield)
 : The weapon of Change Dragon, which forms the body of the Power Bazooka.
 : The weapon of Change Gryphon, which forms the front barrel of the Power Bazooka.
 : The weapon of Change Pegasus, which forms the lower-body cover of the Power Bazooka.
 : The weapon of Change Mermaid, which forms the targeting scope of the Power Bazooka.
 : The weapon of Change Phoenix, which forms the upper-body cover of the Power Bazooka.
 : The finishing cannon formed from the Zooka weapons of the Changemen. Hiryu supplies the shell, while Sayaka aims the weapon. On one occasion in Episode 7, it received a power-up. In Episode 36,  the Changemen learned to infuse the Earth Force inside the shell to further enhance its power, in the final episode, it was used to fire a signal for Gyodai to enlarge the memory doll.

Vehicles
 : Each Changeman rides one of these motorcycles.
 : The 4WD for the quintet
 : This vehicle was used in one episode during their clash with Ahames' forces in Nagasaki.
 : Modeled after the Space Shuttle, is the ship that transports the team's mecha to the danger zone, and is the first Terran-made carrier to travel into space.

Mecha
 : The team's signature mecha. Hiryu yells "Earth Conversion Start!" to begin the mecha's conversion, and then  to combine them.
: The mecha of Change Dragon, which forms the head and lower body of the Change Robo. It is stored in the fuselage of the Shuttle Basee, with wings and rudders retracted. It appeared again in Gaoranger vs Super Sentai.
: A helicopter piloted by Change Gryphon and Change Mermaid, it forms the torso and arms of the Change Robo. It is stored in back of the Shuttle Base, behind the Jet Changer I. Mai once took it for a joyride.
: A cruiser piloted by Change Pegasus and Change Phoenix, it forms the legs of the Change Robo. It is stored in halves in back of the Shuttle Base, with the Heli Changer II between the two halves.

Allies
 : The head of the Blitzkrieg Squadron who seems cruel at first but has a caring side too. He is eventually revealed to be Yui Ibuki of Planet Heath which was destroyed by Gozma.
 : A group of people from various military organization like the Changeman, who function as the team's support. They help out the Changeman in certain situations.
Captain Inogoro: A Blitzkrieg Squadron mechanic who works on the Auto Changers

Aliens
The Changemen meet other aliens who end up on Earth because of Gozma:
 : A young girl from the planet Rigel with superhuman abilities. She is used in tipping the scales for Gozma for when Rigelian girls reach an age they release a massive energy which would give power to whoever is caught in its path. Though aged by 20 years old thanks to Giluke's scheme to become stronger, Nana gains telepathic abilities along with heighten physical abilities.
 : An alien from 
 : Gaata's wife and son. Their role in the plot grows towards the end of the series because Waraji is able to play in his ocarina a tune which induces homesickness on space creatures, and is eventually used against Gozma members themselves, causing them (even a reluctant Gaata) to target the boy, who angrily breaks the ocarina and storms off, declaring he has no father. Zoorii, in the meantime, becomes pregnant with her and Gaata's daughter, forcing him to abandon Gozma for good.

Star Cluster Great Star League Gozma
The  is an interstellar criminal shogunate that devastates planets and uses the survivors as warriors to invade other planets. The group is based on the battleship .

: Bazeu is the leader of Gozma who only appears to his followers as a giant blue limbless torso, which is an illusion created by his true form: the living planet  who absorbs other worlds throughout its interstellar conquest of the universe. Though he spares some planets, Bazeu uses them as a means to intimidate his minions with their destruction as both a drafting method and to ensure no failure. He manages to approach Earth undetected by hiding himself into the tail of Halley's Comet, but is ultimately destroyed by the Changemen after they ride the Change Robo deep onto his body and destroy its core.
He uses a sword made for the strongest warrior from his homeworld.
: Booba is a former space pirate who has been conscripted to be one of the lieutenants of Giluke. Armed with the Buldobas Sickle, Booba is the rival of Change Dragon. Eventually, learning of the brain washing he went through after seeing his former love, Booba helps free Sheema from the control of Gozma's before dying in a duel against Change Dragon.
When her planet was conquered, she was taken in by a Space Beast Warrior named Wuba and raised on its milk, turning her into a cold warrior with a deep male voice and no memories of her past. Thanks to Booba, she manages to return to her former self and joins forces with the Changemen.
: Ahames is the former queen of  who joined with Giluke in his attempt to overthrow Bazeu. After the attempt failed, Ahames's whereabouts were unknown until she arrives to Earth. After Giluke is killed the first time, she takes over as the leader of Gozma's forces until his return. With all her minions defeated or defected, she was transformed into a Space Beast Warrior by Super Giluke, and used her newfound powers to pinpoint the secret base of the Changeman. Regaining her original form, but not her sanity, she destroys the base completely, killing herself in the process.
He reluctantly joins Gozma for the safety of his family, and also for the sake of his family, he eventually defects, siding with the Changemen through the rest of the series.
: A one-eyed creature from the planet of the same name who is used by Gozma to enlarge its minions. Left alone into a derelict Gozmard, he is rescued by the Changemen and aids them in the final battle against Bazeu.
: Jangeran is the familiar of Ahames. It is a twin-headed dragon whose left head fires a cone of ice while its right unleashes a torrent of flame.
: Gozma's foot soldiers, these blue skinned aliens are feral creatures that use their talons as weapons. If wounded enough, a Hidler would bleed steam before evaporating within seconds.

Episodes

Films
Changeman theatrical short
Changeman Shuttle Base! The Critical Moment!

International Broadcasts and Home Video
In its' home country of Japan, both of the Changeman films were released on VHS. Dengeki Sentai Changeman: The Movie and Dengeki Sentai Changeman: Shuttle Base! The Critical Moment! as well as on DVD for "Super Sentai THE MOVIE BOX" on July 21, 2003, later released on "Super Sentai The MOVIE VOL.3" on July 21, 2004, and a Blu-Ray release on June 21, 2011 as part of the "Super Sentai THE MOVIE Blu-Ray BOX 1976-1995." In 2009 from June 21 till October 21, the full series was released on home video for the first time with five DVD volumes and each volume contains 11 episodes in a 2-disc set. Seven episodes (being 1, 33, 43, 51-53 and 55) are included in the Super Sentai Ichimi Blu-ray 1982-1986" released on April 14, 2021 for a Blu-Ray release.
In Thailand, the series was aired with a Thai dub in 1987 on Channel 7, distributed and licensed by TIGA Company, Ltd.
The series was broadcast in Brazil under the title Esquadrão Relâmpago Changeman (Lightning Squadron Changeman) airing on Rede Manchete on February 22, 1988 with all episodes dubbed in Brazilian Portuguese. It was a huge hit and was the first Super Sentai to air in the region and has enjoyed unprecendeted success along with another Toei tokusatsu series MegaBeast Investigator Juspion (which aired as O Fantástico Jaspion) as that aired around the same time on the same channel, causing them to air more tokusatsu shows. Years later, it continued re-runs on other channels and it even received a VHS release by Everest Video at the peak of its' popularity spread across several volumes. It even received a full DVD release with all episodes included with both the original Japanese audio with Brazilian Portuguese subtitles and also the Brazilian Portuguese dub included.
In the Philippines, Changeman was aired on ABS-CBN from 1988 to 1989.
In South Korea, the series was imported and dubbed in Korean in 1993 exclusively for home video by Daeyoung Panda and aired under the same title as the original Japanese title (전격전대 체인지맨, Jeongyeogjeondae Cheinjimaen). This marks the first and only time that a Korean dubbed Sentai kept the title as is. As for the Korean dub of Kaizoku Sentai Gokaiger, it was officially renamed as Power Rangers Changeman. (파워레인저 체인지맨)

Appearances in Power Rangers
The Changeman team appeared in Power Rangers Megaforce as the Blitz Rangers.

Cast
Hiryu Tsurugi: Haruki Hamada
Sho Hayate: Kazuoki Takahashi
Yuma Ozora: Shiro Izumi
Sayaka Nagisa, Fake Sayaka (episode 22) and Icarus' mother (Episode 41): Hiroko Nishimoto
Mai Tsubasa: Mai Oishi
Commander Yui Ibuki: Jun Fujimaki
Officer Suzuki: Genshu Suzuki
Officer Shoji: Hirokazu Shoji
Officer Watanabe: Minoru Watanabe
Officer Nomoto: Nahoko Nomoto
Officer Kikuchi: Kaori Kikuchi
Waraji: Kazuhiko Ohara
Nana: Tokie Shibata
General Giluke: Shohei Yamamoto
Queen Ahames; Voice of Maze: Fukumi Kuroda
Star King Bazeu: Kazuto Kuwabara
Adjutant Booba: Yoshinori Okamoto
Adjutant Sheema: Kana Fujieda

Voice actors
Star King Bazeu: Seizō Katō
Adjutant Sheema (Male voice): Michiro Iida
Navigator Gator: Hiroshi Masuoka
Gyodai: Takeshi Watabe
Zoorii: Makoto Kōsaka
Narration: Nobuo Tanaka

Crew
Directors: Minoru Yamada, Takao Nagaishi, Nagafumi Hori
Writers: Hirohisa Soda, Kunio Fujii, Kyoko Sagiyama
Action Directors: Junji Yamaoka, Ryoujirou Nishimoto

Songs

References

External links
 Dengeki Sentai Changeman website 

Super Sentai
TV Asahi original programming
1980s Japanese television series
1985 Japanese television series debuts
1986 Japanese television series endings
Fictional soldiers
Works about legendary creatures